Brigitte Mohn (née Scholz, born June 28, 1964) is a German businesswoman and a member of the Mohn family that has a significant influence on Bertelsmann group and the Bertelsmann Stiftung. Mohn is also chair of the 's executive board.

Life
Brigitte Mohn is one of three children of Liz and Reinhard Mohn. After completing her secondary education in 1984, Mohn studied political science, art history and German philology at the universities of Bamberg, Münster and Augsburg. In 1993, she received her doctorate from the Witten-Herdecke University. In 2001, she completed an MBA at Otto Beisheim School of Management in Vallendar, Germany, and the Kellogg School of Management in Evanston, Illinois, United States.

Career
Brigitte Mohn began her career in 1993 as an editor at the Kiel Institute for the World Economy. Then she worked for Random House in the United States and Canada. From 1997 to 1998, Mohn was a management consultant at McKinsey & Company in Hamburg, Germany, before moving to Switzerland for her job at  until 2000.

In December 2001, Mohn was appointed chair of the executive board of the German Stroke Foundation, which was established by her mother, Liz Mohn, in 1993. After joining the Bertelsmann Stiftung in 2002, Mohn was appointed to the management board at the beginning of 2005. She oversees programs covering health, communities and civil society, for example.

In 2008, Mohn took a significant role at Bertelsmann group: She joined the Bertelsmann Verwaltungsgesellschaft, which controls the voting rights at the shareholders' meeting; additionally, she was appointed to the group's supervisory board, where Mohn represents the sixth generation of the owner family.

Other activities
 German Startups Association, Member of the Board of Trustees (since 2019)
 Rhön-Klinikum, Member of the Supervisory Board (2002–2020)

Awards
 2009: Ethics in Business Award
 2018: Erika Pitzer Prize

References

External links

 

1964 births
Bertelsmann
German mass media owners
Living people
Businesspeople from Stuttgart
University of Augsburg alumni
University of Münster alumni
Kellogg School of Management alumni
20th-century German businesswomen
20th-century German businesspeople
University of Bamberg alumni
German expatriates in Switzerland
21st-century German businesswomen
21st-century German businesspeople